The Charter of Ban Kulin (Bosnian-Serbian-Croatian: Povelja Kulina bana / Повеља Кулина бана) was a trade agreement between the Banate of Bosnia and the Republic of Ragusa that effectively regulated Ragusan trade rights in Bosnia, written on 29 August 1189. It is one of the oldest written state documents in the region.

According to the charter, Bosnian Ban Kulin promises to knez Krvaš and all the people of Dubrovnik full freedom of movement and trading across his country. The charter is written in two languages: Latin and an old form of Shtokavian dialect, with the Shtokavian part being a loose translation of the Latin original. The scribe was named as Radoje, and the script is Bosnian Cyrillic (Bosančica).

Language
The Charter is the first diplomatic document written in the old Bosnian language and represents the oldest work written in the Bosnian Cyrillic script (Bosančica).  As such, it is of particular interest to both linguists and historians.

Apart from the trinitarian invocation (U ime oca i sina i svetago duha), which characterizes all charters of the period, the language of the charter is completely free of Church Slavonic influence. The language of the charter reflects several important phonological changes that have occurred in Bosnian until the 12th century:
 loss of Common Slavic nasal vowels /ę/ > /e/ and /ǫ/ > /u/
 loss of weak jers (occurred during the 10th century; ceased to be spoken in the 11th century). Scribal tradition preserved them word-finally but they were not actually uttered.
 The vowel yeri /y/ never occurs word-initially, and turns to /u/ after /k, g, x/. In the 12th century it has a very limited usage, and starts being replaced with the vowel /i/, a change also attested in Humac tablet.
 change of word-initial cluster vь- to /u/

History
The first to bring the charter to the public eye was Serbian émigrée Jeremija Gagić (1783–1859), the former Russian consul in Dubrovnik, who claimed to have saved the document in 1817. It was later known that the document was held in the Dubrovnik Archive until at least 1832, when it was copied by Đorđe Nikolajević and published in Monumenta Serbica. Nikolajević was entrusted with copying Cyrillic manuscripts from the Dubrovnik Archive (in the Kingdom of Dalmatia) in 1832 for scholarly publication, at which time he stole the manuscripts, along with other manuscripts such as the 1249 charter of Bosnian Ban Matej Ninoslav, the 1254 charter of Serbian King Stefan Uroš I and župan Radoslav, the 1265 letters of Stefan Uroš I and the 1385 letters of King Tvrtko I. Jeremija Gagić obtained the charter that Nikolajević stole, and sold or donated it to the Academy of Sciences in Saint Petersburg, where it is held today. Dubrovnik Archive preserves another two copies of the charter.

Analysis
 
The Saint Petersburg copy is in the literature usually called "the original" (or copy A), and copies stored in the Dubrovnik Archive as "younger copy" (or copy B) and "older copy" (or copy C). At first it was thought that the Saint Petersburg copy, which was the first one to be published and studied, was the original and others were much younger copies (for example, Milan Rešetar dated the copies B and C into the latter half of the 13th century) but that was called into question by later analyses. According to a study by Josip Vrana, evidence that copy A represents the original remains inconclusive at best, and according to a comparative analysis that copy represents only a conceptual draft of the charter according to which the real original was written. Copies B and C are independent copies of the real original, which was different from the copy A.

Palaeographic analysis indicates that all three copies of the charter were written in approximately the same period at the turn of the 12th century, and that their scribes originate from the same milieu, representing the same scribal tradition. Their handwriting on the one hand relates to the contemporary Cyrillic monuments, and on the other hand it reflects an influence of the Western, Latin culture. Such cultural and literary opportunities have existed in the Travunia–Zeta area which encompassed the Dubrovnik region at the period. Copy A probably, and copies B and C with certainty, originate from the scribe who lived and was educated in Dubrovnik and its surroundings.

Linguistic analysis however does not point to any specific characteristics of the Dubrovnikan speech, but it does show that the language of the charter has common traits with Ragusan documents from the first half of the 13th century, or those in which Ragusan scribal offices participated. Given that Ragusan delegates participated in the drafting of their copy, everything points that a scribe from Dubrovnik area must have participated in the formulation of the text of the copy A. However, that the final text was written at the court of Ban Kulin is proved by how the date was written: using odь rožьstva xristova, and not the typical first-half-of-the-13th-century Dubrovnikan lěto uplьšteniě.

Legacy
It is regarded part of Bosnian, Serbian and Croatian literature. According to Bosnian author Rusmir Mahmutćehajić, the charter is of great significance in Bosnian national pride and historical heritage.

Notes

References
 
Fejzić, Fahira. "Povelja Kulina bana–međunarodna zakletva, diplomatsko-trgovinski ugovor i svjedok vremena." Godišnjak Bošnjačke zajednice kulture» Preporod « 1 (2009): 143-148.
Sivrić, Ivan. "POVELJA KULINA BANA DUBROVNIKU." Suvremena pitanja 6 (2008): 174-177.
Jalimam, Salih. "O LATINSKOM TEKSTU U POVELJI BANA KULINA." Istrazivanja: Casopis Fakulteta Humanistickih Nauka 11 (2016).
Peco, Asim. "Povelja Kulina bana u svjetlosti štokavskih govora XII i XIII vijeka–u." Osamsto godina Povelje bosanskog bana Kulina, 1189-1989 (1989).
Vukomanović, S. "Leksika i gramatička značenja u Povelji Kulina bana, u: Osamsto godina Povelje bosanskog bana Kulina 1189–1989." Posebna izdanja ANUBiH, knj 23 (1989): 77-97.
Karavdić, Zenaida. "O Povelji Kulina bana–“Bez’v’sega z’loga primysla”."

Links 
 Bosnia Yearns for Return of Its ‘Birth Certificate’, Balkan Insight, 07 SEP 17

Medieval documents of Bosnia and Herzegovina
Republic of Ragusa
1189 in Europe
12th century in Bosnia
12th-century documents
Cyrillic manuscripts
Bosnian Cyrillic texts